The Tides is a building in Miami Beach. As a 49-meter building in 1936, it was the tallest in the city and one of the tallest in the state of Florida. The building was renovated in 1997, and is currently a residential condominium. and luxury hotel.

It was previously operated by the Chris Blackwell resort group Island Outpost. Since being operated by Island Outpost, it has had multiple owners and is currently the King & Grove Tides South Beach

References

Buildings and structures completed in 1936
Residential skyscrapers in Miami Beach, Florida
1936 establishments in Florida